Events in the year 1702 in Norway.

Incumbents
Monarch: Frederick IV

Events
May 19 - The largest city fire in Bergen's history. 7/8 of the city burns down.

Arts and literature

Births

Rasmus Paludan, bishop (d. 1759).

Deaths
Iver Leganger, priest and writer (born 1629).

See also

References